Danil Ivanavich Volkovich (18 April 1900 – 1937 or 1943) was a Soviet Belarusian statesman and politician who served as the chairman of the Council of  People's Commissars of the Byelorussian Soviet Socialist Republic from 30 May to 8 September 1937 and first secretary of the Communist Party of Belarussia from January 25 to March 14, 1937. He was born in Masty.

References 

1900 births
1943 deaths
People from Masty
People from Grodnensky Uyezd
Members of the Central Committee of the Communist Party of Byelorussia
Heads of government of the Byelorussian Soviet Socialist Republic
Members of the Central Executive Committee of the Byelorussian Soviet Socialist Republic
Great Purge victims from Belarus
Soviet rehabilitations